Myoporum caprarioides, commonly known as slender myoporum, is a plant in the figwort family, Scrophulariaceae. It is a shrub with wart-like tubercles covering its branches and leaves, especially on the upper surface and white flowers spotted with mauve, or all blue-mauve, present for most of the warmer months.

Description
They are elliptic in shape with minute serrations on the edges. The upper surface is shinier and darker than the lower surface which has a raised midrib.

The flowers appear singly or in small groups in the axils of the leaves and have 5 sepals and 5 white spotted pink or entirely pink petals joined at their base to form a tube. There are 4 stamens which extend beyond the petals. Flowering occurs throughout the whole year, apart from the coldest months and is followed by brown fruits which are drupes,  in diameter and roughly spherical in shape.

Taxonomy and naming
Myoporum caprarioides was first formally described in 1837 by George Bentham in Stephan Endlicher's Enumeratio plantarum quas in Novae Hollandiæ ora austro-occidentali ad fluvium Cygnorum et in sinu Regis Georgii collegit Carolus Liber Baro de Hügel. The specific epithet refers to a similarity to the genus Capraria.

Distribution and habitat
Myoporum caprarioides occurs along the coast of Western Australia from Dongara to Busselton, often in tuart (Eucalyptus gomphocephala) forest but also along watercourses and in winter-wet areas.

Conservation
Myoporum caprarioides is classified as "not threatened" by the Western Australian Government Department of Parks and Wildlife.

References

caprarioides
Lamiales of Australia
Plants described in 1837
Endemic flora of Western Australia